Ilpe is a river of North Rhine-Westphalia, Germany. The source of the Ilpe is near the town of Altenilpe in the mountainous Sauerland region, at an elevation of approximately 511 m. The river flows on its 8,5 km lang way primarily in northwestern directions into the Wenne in Bremke.

See also
List of rivers of North Rhine-Westphalia

Rivers of North Rhine-Westphalia
Rivers of Germany